Muhammad Abdallah Kounta (born 27 October 1994) is a French sprinter. He competed in the men's 4 × 400 metres relay event at the 2020 Summer Olympics.

References

External links
 

1994 births
Living people
French male sprinters
Athletes (track and field) at the 2020 Summer Olympics
Olympic athletes of France
Athletes from Paris